Cerautola crowleyi, the Crowley's epitola, is a butterfly in the family Lycaenidae. It is found in Guinea-Bissau, Guinea, Sierra Leone, Ivory Coast, Ghana, Togo, Nigeria, Cameroon, Gabon, the Republic of the Congo, the Central African Republic, Angola, the Democratic Republic of the Congo, Uganda, Tanzania and Zambia. Its habitat consists of forests.

The larvae feed on foliate lichen.

Subspecies
C. c. crowleyi (Guinea-Bissau, Guinea, Sierra Leone, Ivory Coast, Ghana, Togo, western Nigeria)
C. c. congdoni Libert & Collins, 1999 (north-western Tanzania, Zambia)
C. c. holochroma (Berger, 1981) (eastern Democratic Republic of the Congo, Uganda)
C. c. leucographa Libert, 1999 (Cameroon, Gabon, Congo, northern Angola, Central African Republic, western Democratic Republic of the Congo)

References

Butterflies described in 1890
Poritiinae
Butterflies of Africa